Ehrenpreis is a surname. Notable people with the surname include:

Leon Ehrenpreis (1930–2010), American mathematician
Ehrenpreis conjecture
Malgrange–Ehrenpreis theorem
Mordecai Ehrenpreis, (1869–1951), Polish-Swedish rabbi

See also
Veronica (plant), German name: Ehrenpreis

German-language surnames